Maternity Protection Convention, 1919 is  an International Labour Organization Convention.

It was established in 1919:
Having decided upon the adoption of certain proposals with regard to "women's employment, before and after childbirth, including the question of maternity benefit",...

Modification 

The principles contained in the convention were subsequently revised and included in ILO Convention C103, Maternity Protection Convention (Revised), 1952, and in Maternity Protection Convention, 2000.

Ratifications
As of 2013, the convention had been ratified by 34 states. Of the ratifying states, eight have subsequently denounced the treaty.

External links 
Text.
Ratifications.

Maternity
Motherhood
Women's rights instruments
Treaties concluded in 1919
Treaties entered into force in 1921
Treaties of Algeria
Treaties of Argentina
Treaties of the Kingdom of Bulgaria
Treaties of Burkina Faso
Treaties of the Central African Republic
Treaties of Colombia
Treaties of Croatia
Treaties of Cuba
Treaties of Cameroon
Treaties of the French Fourth Republic
Treaties of Gabon
Treaties of the Weimar Republic
Treaties of the Kingdom of Greece
Treaties of Guinea
Treaties of Italy
Treaties of Latvia
Treaties of the Libyan Arab Republic
Treaties of Luxembourg
Treaties of Mauritania
Treaties of Nicaragua
Treaties of Panama
Treaties of the Kingdom of Romania
Treaties of Spain under the Restoration
Treaties of North Macedonia
Treaties of Venezuela
Treaties of Ivory Coast
1919 in labor relations
1919 in women's history